The Six-headed Wild Ram (from Sumerian šeg-saĝ-6: ram with six heads) in Sumerian religion was one of the Heroes slain by Ninurta, patron god of Lagash, in ancient Iraq. Its body was hung on the dust-guard of Ninurta's chariot (lines 55-63 ).

See also
Ninlil
Sumerian religion
Anzû

References

External links
 The Electronic Text Corpus of Sumerian Literature

Mesopotamian legendary creatures